Elisabetta Durelli (born 17 January 1936) is an Italian gymnast. She competed in seven events at the 1952 Summer Olympics.

References

1936 births
Living people
Italian female artistic gymnasts
Olympic gymnasts of Italy
Gymnasts at the 1952 Summer Olympics
Place of birth missing (living people)
20th-century Italian women